Droplitz is a 2009 puzzle video game developed by Blitz Arcade and published by Atlus. It was released on Xbox Live Arcade on June 24, 2009 and June 25, 2009 on PlayStation Network. It is also available on Microsoft Windows and iOS. In May 2012 a sequel called Droplitz Delight was released for Windows Phone.

Reception

Droplitz received generally positive reviews from critics upon release. On Metacritic, the game holds scores of 78/100 for the PC version based on 6 reviews, 76/100 for the PlayStation 3 version based on 13 reviews, and 74/100 for the Xbox 360 version based on 25 reviews. On GameRankings, the game holds scores of 81.50% for the PC version based on 2 reviews, 74.45% for the PlayStation 3 version based on 11 reviews, and 74.10% for the Xbox 360 version based on 26 reviews.

Dispute
There is an ongoing dispute as to who originally came up with the original game concept for Droplitz as an individual provided evidence that they came up with a very similar game concept over one year before the release of Droplitz and attempted to pitch it to the same game studio, Blitz Games Studios, which would then go on to produce the Droplitz game.

References

External links
 Press Release - IGN

2009 video games
Atlus games
PlayStation Network games
Windows games
IOS games
Xbox 360 Live Arcade games
Puzzle video games
Video games developed in the United Kingdom
Windows Phone games
Blitz Games Studios games
Single-player video games